Takumi Kobe (神戸 拓光, born February 23, 1985, in Ushiku, Ibaraki) is a Japanese former professional baseball outfielder who played from 2008 to 2013 with the Chiba Lotte Marines in Japan's Nippon Professional Baseball.

External links

1985 births
Living people
Baseball people from Ibaraki Prefecture
Honolulu Sharks players
Japanese expatriate baseball players in the United States
Nippon Professional Baseball outfielders
Chiba Lotte Marines players